NGC 1484 is a barred spiral galaxy in the constellation Eridanus, 48 million light-years from Earth. It is part of the Fornax Cluster, that contains approximately 200 galaxies, making it the second richest galaxy cluster in 100 million light-years after the Virgo Cluster. 

It was discovered by William Herschel on November 28, 1837. Its distance and size on the night sky convert to an actual size of 35,000 light years, only a third or one-quarter the size of the Milky Way Galaxy.

See also 
NGC 1399, central galaxy of the Fornax Cluster
NGC 1531 and NGC 1532, pair of nearby Fornax Cluster galaxies
NGC 1365
NGC 1316

References 

Barred spiral galaxies
1484
Eridanus (constellation)
Fornax Cluster
014071